Polyclinidae is a family of tunicates in the order Enterogona. It describes a group of marine animals.

Genera
The World Register of Marine Species lists the following genera:
Aplidiopsis Lahille, 1890
Aplidium Savigny, 1816
Fragaroides
Homoeodistoma
Macrenteron Redikorzev, 1927
Morchellium Giard, 1872
Neodictyon Sanamyan, 1988
Polyclinella Harant, 1931
Polyclinum Savigny, 1816
Sidneioides Kesteven, 1909
Synoicum Phipps, 1774
Morchelloides (nomen nudum)

References

Aplousobranchia
Tunicate families
Taxa named by Henri Milne-Edwards